Night of the Seven Swords is a 1986 adventure module for the Oriental Adventures rules of the Advanced Dungeons & Dragons fantasy role-playing game.

Plot summary
Night of the Seven Swords includes four linked scenarios. The player characters must penetrate a haunted castle to retrieve several relics from the castle, but the forces of Lord Korimori try to stop their efforts.

Night of the Seven Swords concerns a rivalry between two clans, a haunted castle, and a box of relics. After an encounter in which the party is required to be suitably honorable, the characters explore the haunted castle of Ito-Jo. After attaining their objective in the castle, the characters must make a delivery, while avoiding the machinations of their lord's rival.

Night of the Seven Swords details another province in the world presented in the original Oriental Adventures.

Publication history
OA2 Night of the Seven Swords was published by TSR in 1986 as a 48-page booklet with an outer folder. The module was written by Jon Pickens, David “Zeb” Cook, Harold Johnson, Rick Swan, Ed Carmien, and David James Ritchie, with cover art drawn by Clyde Caldwell and interior art by James Holloway.

OA2 is the second adventure produced for Oriental Adventures and is suggested for a party of 6–8 level 4–6 player characters. The module comes in the form of a 48-page booklet inside a 3-part wraparound cover that can be used as a Dungeon Master's (DM) screen. The inside cover shows the plans to the castle Ito-Jo, presented in the "exploded view" previously used in the Dungeoneer's Survival Guide. The cover also has a more conventional groundplan of the dungeon beneath the castle, and of an inn which is featured in the adventure. A full-color map of Maeshi Province is seen on the outside of the cover, visible to the players when the cover is stood up as a DM's screen. The booklet begins with a 3-page background section that details the geography and history of Maeshi province, followed by information for the DM and notes on setting up the adventure.

Reception
Graeme Davis reviewed Night of the Seven Swords for White Dwarf #86. Davis found the plot interesting and believable, although he was initially concerned that the main part of the adventure in the haunted castle was just another standard dungeon bash. However, he concluded that "it's a very good haunted castle, and even those who don't normally enjoy dungeon bashes will probably find it interesting and enjoyable. There are some interestingly Oriental bits and pieces which maintain the atmosphere nicely". He felt that some of the encounters were tough for the suggested party strength, although he suggested that a reasonable number of spellcasters should help to cope with that. He felt that it would have been nice to have a poster-size map of Maeshi Province, but found that the two main settings of the castle and the inn would make useful stock locations for OA. Davis concluded that the adventure is "an interesting and well-balanced mixture of role-playing and fighting". He considered having OA2 and OA1 in different provinces to be a drawback, although he figured that a DM wanting to link the two adventures in a campaign should be able to tweak the setting and history with a little work. He noted that Bushido referees could do some conversion work to fit the scenario into that game.  Davis concluded the review by stating, "Overall, it's a nice adventure, with the Oriental Adventures rules used to good effect throughout."

Michael Mullen reviewed the adventure in Space Gamer/Fantasy Gamer No. 81. He commented that the module "gives a nifty 'haunted house' adventure". Mullen concluded that Night of the Seven Swords adds a province although it is not as filled with details as the one in [Swords of the Daimyo].  The territory is more isolated and less populated, however.  The main story of this module, recovering a relic from a haunted castle, is well constructed and the adventure is challenging.  There is a real nasty new monster here, too."

References

Dungeons & Dragons modules
Role-playing game supplements introduced in 1986